The Battle of Dunkirk was a conflict between French and British allies and German forces in 1940 during the Second World War.

Battle of Dunkirk, Raid on Dunkirk or Siege of Dunkirk may also refer to:
Battle of Dunkirk (1383), a battle between English and Franco-Flemish forces that Frans Ackerman fought in
Battle of Dunkirk (1639), a naval action during the Eighty Years' War between a Dutch fleet and the Spanish Dunkirk Squadron on 18 February
Battle of the Dunes (1658) or the Battle of Dunkirk, a battle between Allied and Spanish forces
Siege of Dunkirk (1793), a siege by British and Hanoverian forces against a French garrison during the French Revolutionary War
Raid on Dunkirk (1800), a conflict between British and French naval forces during the French Revolutionary War
Siege of Dunkirk (1944–45), a siege by Allied forces against a German garrison during the Second World War

See also
 Dunkirk (disambiguation)
 Dunkirk evacuation,a major military operation that took place during the 1940 Battle of Dunkirk